Tombac, or tombak, is a brass alloy with high copper content and 5–20% zinc content. Tin, lead or arsenic may be added for colouration.
It is a cheap malleable alloy mainly used for medals, ornament, decoration and some munitions.
In older use, the term may apply to brass alloy with a zinc content as high as 28–35%.

Etymology
The term tombak is derived from tembaga, an Indonesian/Malay word of Javanese origin meaning copper.  Tembaga entered Dutch usage concurrent with their colonisation of Indonesia. Likely, the term was used generically to describe Indonesian high-copper brass items, including gamelan gongs. It is one of the very few Indonesian loan words used in English or German.

Common types
 Modern CuZn15 (DIN: CuZn15 ; UNS: C23000 ; BS: CW 502L (CZ 102) ; ISO: CuZn15) - tombak with a gold colour, very good for cold forming, suitable for pressing, hammering, or embossing
 modern CuZn12 (not standardized) - same characteristics and applications as CuZn15, slightly different colour
 modern CuZn10 (DIN: CuZn10; UNS: C22000; BS: CW 501L (CZ 101); ISO: CuZn10) - similar characteristics and applications as CuZn15 und CuZn12, noticeable reddish colour
 modern white tombac - CuZn10 that is zinc content 10%, with trace arsenic
 modern enamel tombac or emailler tombak - an alloy of 95% copper and 5% zinc, suitable for enamelling, therefore the name.

Ure notes the following forms of tombak in widespread use during the time the text was published (1856):
"Gilting tombac":
Copper 82%, zinc 18%, lead 1.5%, tin 3%
Copper 82%, zinc 18%, lead 3%, tin 1%
Copper 82%, zinc 18%, lead, tin 0.2%
"French tombac for sword handles", pommels and fittings: copper 80%, zinc 17%, 3% tin
"Yellow tombac of Paris" for gilt ornaments: copper 85%, zinc 15%, trace% tin
"Hanover tombac": copper 85.3%, zinc 14.7%
Chrysochalk: copper 86%, zinc 14%
"Red tombac of Paris": copper 90%, zinc 7.9%, 1.5% lead
"Red tombac of Vienna": copper 97.8%, zinc 2.2%

Piggot states the brass used for machinery and locomotives in England was composed of copper 74.5%, zinc 25%, and lead 0.5%, which would make it a tombac according to Ure.
Piggot's own definition of tombak is problematic at best: "red brass, or tombak, as it is called by some, has a great preponderance of copper, from 5 ounces of zinc down to 1/4 ounce of zinc to the pound [of copper]."

Tempers
Typical tempers are soft annealed and rolled hard.

Applications

Tombac is soft and easy to work by hand: hand tools can easily punch, cut, enamel, repousse, engrave, gild, or etch it. It has a higher sheen than most brasses or copper, and does not easily tarnish.
Historically, it was used by the Javanese as a faux gold finish for objects d'art and ornaments. 
 Most commonly, tombac in modern society is used in medals and awards of lesser importance, such as the German Oldenburg Long-Service Medallion for their Gendarmerie.
The Pickelhaube and cuirass of the Imperial German and Prussian Army were at one time made of tombac.
 German, particularly Prussian, field uniforms (which were also sold to equip the White Russians), had buttons and decorative fittings made of tombac.
 Currently, tombac foils are used in arts and crafts for decorative articles, especially as an economic alternative to very expensive gold leaf.
 Industry uses tombac foil for heating foils and etch applications.
 Gilding metal is a type of tombac which is one of the most common jacketing materials for full metal and hollow-point jacketed bullets.
 The 1980 Olympic 'Bronze' medals were actually tombac.
 During World War II, Canada minted 5-cent pieces (nickels) in tombac in 1942 and 1943.
 The German military used it for some combat medals during World War II.
 The Swedish armed forces adopted a special-service round for the Carl Gustav m/45 submachine gun with a tombac-plated steel jacket surrounding the lead core of the bullet loaded in the cartridge.
 Brass alloys, including tombak, are occasionally used in architecture, such as ornaments, roofs or outside wall plating. It withstands corrosion well.

See also

References

External links

National Pollutant Inventory - Copper and compounds fact sheet
Tombac - DiracDelta Science & Engineering Encyclopedia
The Line Pickelhaube (Detailed explanation of Pickelhaube and use of Tombak for economic reasons)
 Schlenk German tombak manufacturer: 

Copper alloys
Zinc alloys

de:Messing#Messingsorten